The Daughtery Peaks are a small cluster of bare rock peaks  high that surmount the south wall of Cosmonaut Glacier in the Southern Cross Mountains of Victoria Land, Antarctica. They were mapped by the United States Geological Survey from surveys and from U.S. Navy air photos, 1960–64, and named by the Advisory Committee on Antarctic Names for Franklin J. Daughtery, an aviation structural mechanic with U.S. Navy Squadron VX-6, and a participant in six Deep Freeze operations.

References
 

Mountains of Victoria Land
Borchgrevink Coast